Cretorectolobus is an extinct carpet shark. It was described by G.R. Case in 1978, and the type species is C. olsoni, which existed during the Campanian in Canada and the United States. Another species, C. gracilis, was described by Charlie J. Underwood and Mitchell in 1999, from the Hauterivian to Barremian strata of the Speeton Clay Formation of England. The species epithet refers to the shark's teeth, which Underwood and Mitchell described as gracile and narrow in form. A new species, C. robustus, was described from the Cenomanian of Canada by Underwood and Stephen L. Cumbaa in 2010.

Species 
 C. olsoni Case, 1978
 C. gracilis Underwood & Mitchell, 1999
 C. robustus Underwood & Cumbaa, 2010

Fossil distribution 
Fossils of Cretorectolobus have been found in:
Hauterivian-Barremian
 Speeton Clay Formation, England

Albian
 Cedar Mountain Formation, Utah
 Kolbay, Kazakhstan

Cenomanian
 Saskatchewan, Canada

Campanian
 Aguja Formation, Mexico
 Dinosaur Park Formation, Alberta
 Judith River Formation, Saskatchewan, Canada and Montana, United States
 Mesaverde Group, Wyoming
 Åsen and Ignaberga, Sweden

Maastrichtian
 Kemp Clay Formation, Texas
 Bakla Hill, Ukraine

References 

Orectolobiformes
Prehistoric cartilaginous fish genera
Early Cretaceous first appearances
Hauterivian life
Barremian life
Albian life
Cenomanian life
Campanian life
Maastrichtian life
Late Cretaceous genus extinctions
Cretaceous fish of Europe
Cretaceous fish of North America
Fossils of Canada
Paleontology in Alberta
Paleontology in Saskatchewan
Fossils of England
Fossils of Kazakhstan
Fossils of Sweden
Fossils of Ukraine
Fossils of the United States
Paleontology in Montana
Paleontology in Texas
Paleontology in Utah
Paleontology in Wyoming
Fossil taxa described in 1978